Phidiana adiuncta is a species of sea slug, a nudibranch, a marine, gastropod mollusk in the family Facelinidae.

Distribution
The length of marine species is 13 mm.

Distribution
This species was described from Punta Mona, on the Caribbean Sea coast of Costa Rica.

References

 Ortea Rato J., Caballer Gutiérrez M. & Moro Abad L. (2004). Dos aeolidaceos con ceratas rojos de la region macaronesica y el mar Caribe (Mollusca: Nudibranchia). Vieraea 32: 83-96

Facelinidae
Gastropods described in 2004